This article presents a list of the historical events and publications of Australian literature during 1927.

Books 
 Marie Bjelke-Petersen – The Moon Minstrel
 Bernard Cronin
 Red Dawson
 White Gold
 Zora Cross – Sons of the Seven Mile
 James Devaney – The Currency Lass : A Tale of the Convict Days
 Mabel Forrest
 Hibiscus Heart
 White Witches
 Mary Gaunt – Saul's Daughter
 Ion Idriess – Madman's Island
 Jack McLaren – The Chain
 Helen Simpson – Cups, Wands and Swords
 E. V. Timms – Red Mask : A Story of the Early Victorian Goldfields

Short stories 
 Jean Devanny – Old Savage and Other Stories 
 Xavier Herbert – "The Atheist"
 Vernon Knowles – Silver Nutmegs
 Vance Palmer – "The Stump"
 Katharine Susannah Prichard
 "The Cooboo"
 "Happiness"

Children's and Young Adult fiction 
 W. M. Fleming – The Hunted Piccaninnies
 Lilian Turner – Nina Comes Home

Poetry 

 Mabel Forrest – Poems
 Mary Gilmore
 "The Tenancy"
 "Turn to Grass"
 Lesbia Harford
 "Lovers Parted"
 "This Way Only"
 Vernon Knowles – The Ripening Years
 John Shaw Neilson – New Poems
 Will H. Ogilvie – Hunting Rhymes
 Percival Serle, R. H. Croll & Frank Wilmot – An Australasian Anthology : Australian and New Zealand Poems
 Kenneth Slessor – "Country Towns"
 Douglas Stewart – "Rock Carving"
 David McKee Wright – "From Dark Rosaleen"
 Judith Wright – "Trapped Dingo"

Biography 
 E. V. Timms – Lawrence, Prince of Mecca

Births 

A list, ordered by date of birth (and, if the date is either unspecified or repeated, ordered alphabetically by surname) of births in 1927 of Australian literary figures, authors of written works or literature-related individuals follows, including year of death.

 3 February – Grace Perry, poet, playwright and editor (died 1987)
 25 April – Peter Yeldham, playwright and novelist
 6 June – Alan Seymour, playwright (died 2015)
 24 August – David Ireland, novelist
 27 November – Lilith Norman, children's writer and editor (died 2017)

Deaths 

A list, ordered by date of death (and, if the date is either unspecified or repeated, ordered alphabetically by surname) of deaths in 1927 of Australian literary figures, authors of written works or literature-related individuals follows, including year of birth.

 15 April – Maybanke Anderson, author (born 1845)
 5 July – Lesbia Harford, poet (born 1891)
 15 August – George Gordon McCrae, poet (born 1833)
31 August – Lillian Pyke, children's writer and, as Erica Maxwell, novelist (born 1881)

See also 
 1927 in poetry
 List of years in literature
 List of years in Australian literature
 1927 in literature
 1926 in Australian literature
 1927 in Australia
 1928 in Australian literature

References

Literature
Australian literature by year
20th-century Australian literature